Astrothelium inspersotuberculosum is a species of corticolous (bark-dwelling) lichen in the family Trypetheliaceae. Found in Bolivia, it was formally described as a new species in 2016 by lichenologists Adam Flakus and André Aptroot. It is somewhat similar to Astrothelium tuberculosum, but unlike that species, it has an inspersed hamathecium (i.e., interpenetrated with granules). Both this characteristic and its resemblance to its namesake are reflected in the species epithet inspersotuberculosum.

References

inspersotuberculosum
Lichen species
Lichens described in 2016
Lichens of Bolivia
Taxa named by André Aptroot
Taxa named by Adam Grzegorz Flakus